Thomas Frederick Onslow (15 January 1821 – 15 July 1883) was an English first-class cricketer. Onslow was the son of British politician Thomas Cranley Onslow and the grandson of Thomas Onslow, 2nd Earl of Onslow, who played first-class cricket for Surrey and the Marylebone Cricket Club.

Onslow represented Hampshire, making his first-class debut in 1848 against an All-England Eleven. Onslow played one further match for the county against the same opposition in 1849.

Onslow died at New Alresford, Hampshire on 15 July 1883.

External links
Thomas Onslow at Cricinfo
Thomas Onslow at CricketArchive

1821 births
1883 deaths
People from Alresford
English cricketers
Hampshire cricketers
Thomas